Coastliner is a bus operator in west Lancashire, England. Established in 2007, it is based at the Brinwell Road garage in Mereside, near Blackpool, although its registered office address is 341 Lytham Road in Blackpool. Between 2007 and 2019, the company was named Nuttall's Coaches Ltd.

The company operates ten bus routes in Blackpool, the Borough of Fylde and the Borough of Wyre.

Background 
Coastliner Buses (formally Nuttalls Coaches Limited) operates a number of bus services and school transport across Blackpool. In 2022, Coastliner became part of Transpora Group, which operates a number of public transport businesses across England.

History 
A blueprint for the future of bus services in the Blackpool area was submitted to the UK Government in 2021. Each council was required to publish a Bus Service Improvement Plan in order to meet eligibility requirements and, thus, receive a share of £3 billion in funding. Blackpool Council held discussions with Blackpool Transport (which it owns), Stagecoach and Coastliner regarding the possibility of crossing the boundaries of other local authorities in an attempt to cover all of The Fylde.

Routes 
Three regular routes are currently in operation, with an additional seven weekday-only school services.

Regular 

 21: Lytham St Annes to Cleveleys (via Clifton Drive and the promenade)
 24: Fleetwood to Poulton-le-Fylde (via Hillylaid Road, Beechwood Drive and Arundel Drive)
 26: Marton Mere circular (via Blackpool Tower and Blackpool Pleasure Beach)

Weekday-only 

 523: Carleton to Saint Aidan's Church of England High School, Preesall
 524: Fleetwood West View to Saint Aidan's (via Cleveleys)
 568: Cleveleys to Millfield Science & Performing Arts College
 594: Weeton to Hodgson Academy (via Staining)
 648: Fleetwood to Poulton schools
 660: Cleveleys to Hodgson Academy
 916: Queen's Manor, Lytham, to St Bede's Catholic High School, Lytham

Fleet 
Coastliner currently has a fleet of twenty buses:

 ADL Enviro400 (fleet numbers 1901, 4005)
 Dennis Dart (2009, unknown, unknown)
 Dennis Trident 2 open-top bus (2600)
 Dennis Trident 2 (4002)
 Midibus
 Single-deck bus (eight)
 Dennis Dart SLF 225
 Dennis Dart 228
 Double-decker bus (two)
 Optare Solo

References

External links 

 Official website

Bus operators in Lancashire
Borough of Fylde
Borough of Wyre
Companies established in 2007
2007 establishments in England